Blues for Allah is the eighth studio album (twelfth overall) by the Grateful Dead. It was recorded February 27  May 7, 1975, and released September 1, 1975. It was the band's third album on their own Grateful Dead Records label and their third studio album in a row. Blues for Allah was the group's highest-charting album until 1987's In the Dark, reaching  12 during a thirteen-week stay on the Billboard Album Chart.

Recording
Blues for Allah was recorded after the Dead began a band hiatus in October 1974. Conscious of needing a new album release for their independent label, the band initiated the project in January 1975. In contrast to the commercial studios employed for their previous studio albums, the band used the studio that rhythm guitarist Bob Weir had built at his new home in Mill Valley, California. Rather than their usual approach of recording studio versions of songs that had matured on stage, the tracks were developed in the studio setting. According to manager Rock Scully, this was in part an attempt by lead guitarist Jerry Garcia to ensure more involvement in the writing process from other band members. In creating material from scratch, the band were able to progress beyond the previous genres in which they had played. Garcia explained "We're working on creating styles, rather than just being eclectic or synthesizing other styles. Thus, it's a little bit more difficult, and considerably more experimental." The main riff of "Franklin's Tower" was partly inspired by the chorus of Lou Reed's 1973 hit "Walk on the Wild Side."

A discernable Middle Eastern theme emerged, supported by Robert Hunter's lyrics. Non-Western time signatures on some of the material added to the concept, as well as experiments with instrumentation, such as flute on the Bach-inspired "Sage & Spirit" (named for Scully's daughters). Garcia said he was "creating scales that generated their own harmony in ways that weren't symmetrical in regular, classical major-minor relationships."

Bassist Phil Lesh recalled "Jerry brought in a strange, almost atonal melodic entity that would evolve into the title song and sequence for the album, and I had sketched out a little Latin-flavored, seven-beat instrumental number inspired by Shelley's poem 'Ozymandias' called 'King Solomon's Marbles'. Besides 'Crazy Fingers,' his marvelous essay in smoky ambiguity, Jerry also contributed a triptych of already written tunes ("Help on the Way", "Slipknot", and "Franklin's Tower") that would become, in live performance, one of our finest exploratory vehicles. Bob had a beautiful guitar instrumental, 'Sage and Spirit', and one of his stompin-est self-congratulatory rockers, 'Music Never Stopped', to round out the album."

"Crazy Fingers" sets music to Hunter's series of haiku. "The Music Never Stopped" began life as "Hollywood Cantata", a Weir-Hunter composition. Weir later used lyrics composed by his main writing partner, John Barlow. Original credits list "King Solomon's Marbles" and "Stronger than Dirt or Milkin' the Turkey" as individual songs. However, later credits list "Stronger than Dirt" and "Milkin' the Turkey" as composed in two parts and combined to make "King Solomon's Marbles". The first section was so-named by Lesh because, like the end of the Doors' "Touch Me", a four-note cadence was reminiscent of a contemporary advertisement jingle (unlike the Doors track, the Dead did not vocalize the slogan).

Describing the atmosphere, Lesh said "Bob's home studio was just large enough to hold all of us … with various guests, notably Mickey [Hart], David Crosby, and John Cipollina, coming and going. We managed to finish the recording of Allah to our satisfaction, and took the tapes into [Artisan Sound Recorders, San Francisco] for the final mix." Band soundman Dan Healy engineered the project, assisted by Robbie Taylor.

Percussionist Mickey Hart, who had sat in at the band's "farewell" concert on October 20, 1974, was invited to the sessions by Garcia and Lesh. Hart had left the band in February 1971. He contributed to the songwriting of "King Solomon's Marbles" and played occasional percussion parts (including the recording of crickets heard on the three-part title suite). Following the release of the album, he was officially reinstated as a band member shortly before the group resumed touring in 1976. Along with contributing as a background singer, Donna Godchaux emerged as a co-vocalist on "The Music Never Stopped" and the vocal sections of the title suite ("Blues for Allah" and the two-pieced "Unusual Occurrences in the Desert"). The guest flutist was Steve Schuster, a former equipment manager for Quicksilver Messenger Service who also played saxophone in the contemporaneous Keith & Donna Band.

Though they had not toured since September 1974, the Grateful Dead performed intermittently in San Francisco during the recording period. Testing the main suite from the album, they performed (as "Jerry Garcia & Friends") at the Bill Graham-produced SF SNACK Benefit (Students Need Athletics, Culture and Kicks) at Kezar Stadium in Golden Gate Park, San Francisco, California on March 23, 1975.  The set, which also featured Merl Saunders (organ) and Ned Lagin (electric piano), was subsequently released on the bonus disc of Beyond Description).

Consideration was given to naming the album after King Faisal of Saudi Arabia, who was assassinated after recording began. The band had been told that he was a fan of the Grateful Dead. Ultimately, Hunter considered his lyrics for the title track a requiem for the ruler. The song also references One Thousand and One Nights.

Release and cover art
The front cover artwork features an iconic image of a frizzy-haired, fiddling skeleton, wearing a crimson thawb and sunglasses, sitting in the window of an ancient rock wall. The work, titled "The Fiddler", was painted in the summer of 1974 by Phillip Garris, and was awarded both the gold medal and the Award of Merit, from the Society of Illustrators. For the cover of the contemporaneous debut album by Kingfish, Garris painted an image with similar elements. (During the Dead's hiatus, Kingfish featured Bob Weir). The back cover art features a similar background with a group portrait of band members, illustrated in relief. Original pressings had a single-sheet insert with lyrics in both English and Arabic.

Unusual for a Grateful Dead album are the number of instrumentals: "Slipknot!", both parts of "King Solomon's Marbles", Weir's "Sage & Spirit" and the "Sand Castles and Glass Camels" section of "Blues for Allah". The nearly structureless title suite that closes the album was performed three times in 1975 and then retired, while several other songs written for the album were performed regularly for the rest of the Dead's career; specifically "Crazy Fingers", "The Music Never Stopped" and the "Help on the Way->Slipknot!->Franklin's Tower" sequence (the last section of which was often played separately).

Drummer Bill Kreutzmann recalled, "Once we started performing them live … we turned a corner and it was a whole other ball game. Those songs are among our very best and they lived up to their potential. We had to play them live in front of an audience in order for that to happen. Once we let them outside and started taking them for walks, they each had a growth spurt during which they really discovered themselves. The album also contained a group of really experimental songs ("Stronger than Dirt", "Unusual Occurrences in the Desert") that bordered on acid jazz composition. Wild stuff. Deep cuts."

To celebrate the release of the album, the band played a small concert at the Great American Music Hall, featuring the album in its entirety. The performance was recorded on 16-track and released in 1991 as One from the Vault. This was the first complete show ever released by the Grateful Dead and the first of an ongoing stream of releases from the band's vault.

Two singles were released from the album, "The Music Never Stopped" and "Franklin's Tower", both backed with "Help on the Way". "The Music Never Stopped" is shorter than the album version, with a differently-recorded ending. "Franklin's Tower" is an edited version and "Help on the Way" fades out before the segue to "Slipknot!" (though fading later on the second single).

Blues for Allah was the final studio album on the Grateful Dead's original independent label. Grateful Dead Records' distribution partner United Artists Records had greater involvement in the rights and publication for this album than previously (e.g. releasing the album in foreign markets on the United Artists (UA) label). This was an attempt to combat counterfeiting and because UA was helping fund the completion of The Grateful Dead Movie in return for further distribution rights and the completion of a soundtrack album. Blues for Allah was in and out of print after the band's move to Arista Records. It was re-pressed in 1979 by UA's Liberty imprint. The album was first released on CD in 1987, after which it has remained in print. It was remastered and expanded for the Beyond Description box set, in October 2004. This version was released separately in 2006, by Rhino Records.

Critical reception

Reviews for Blues for Allah have ranged widely. Reviewing in 1975 for Rolling Stone, Billy Altman wrote that the LP's first side "works beautifully" for the most part, but side two is "total washout". In a retrospective review for AllMusic, Lindsay Planer felt the album "capture[d] the Dead at their most natural and inspired." However, he also felt the title suite was "incongruous when compared to the remainder of this thoroughly solid effort."

Gramophone magazine's reviewer said the band has "discarded their blues approach and opted for semi-country and jazz-rock. But there seems to be no real direction on Blues for Allah." Village Voice critic Robert Christgau, who had been a strong supporter of the band's music, was also disappointed by the record: "This time I find the arch aimlessness of their musical approach neurasthenic and their general muddleheadedness worthy of Yes or the Strawbs."

Track listing

Notes 
CD releases combine tracks 1 and 2, 4 and 5, and 9-11 into one track each to create a seven-track album.
"Franklin's Tower" contains the subtitle "(Roll Away the Dew)" on the LP edition's lyric sheet.
"Distorto" is an early instrumental version of "Crazy Fingers"; "Hollywood Cantata" is an early version of "The Music Never Stopped" with different lyrics.
Tracks 8, 9, 11 and 12 were recorded on February 27, 1975, track 10 on February 28, 1975, and track 13 on May 7, 1975.

Personnel

Grateful Dead
Jerry Garcia – guitar, vocals, production
Donna Jean Godchaux – vocals, production
Keith Godchaux – keyboards, vocals, production
Mickey Hart – percussion, crickets, production
Bill Kreutzmann – drums, percussion, production
Phil Lesh – bass guitar, production
Bob Weir – guitar, vocals, production

Additional musicians
Steven Schuster – flute, reeds
Ned Lagin - keyboards, electronics (Beyond Description bonus tracks only)

Technical personnel
Philip Garris – cover, illustrations
Joe Gastwirt – remastering
Dan Healy – engineer, mixing
Robert Taylor – assistant engineering

Reissue personnel
James Austin – production
Hugh Brown – design, art direction
Reggie Collins – annotation
Jimmy Edwards – associate production
Sheryl Farber – editorial supervision
David Fricke – liner notes
Joe Gastwirt – mastering, production consultation
Robin Hurley – associate production
Eileen Law – research
David Lemieux – production
Richard McCaffrey – photography
Hale Milgrim – associate production
Scott Pascucci – associate production
Ed Perlstein – photography
Cameron Sears – executive production
Rob Taylor – assistant engineering
Steve Vance – design, art direction

Charts
Billboard

Singles – Billboard

References

External links
 The Annotated "Blues for Allah"

1975 albums
Albums recorded in a home studio
Jazz fusion albums by American artists
Grateful Dead albums
Grateful Dead Records albums
United Artists Records albums
Rhino Records albums